Fabián Ernesto Santana (born 29 July 1985 in General Rodríguez, Buenos Aires) is an Argentine football midfielder currently playing for Barracas Central in the Primera B Metropolitana.

Career
Santana made his first team debut with Banfield on 20 February 2005 in a 1-0 away defeat to River Plate. In 2009, he was a non playing member of the squad that won the Apertura 2009 championship.

For the 2010–11 season, Santana was loaned along fellow Banfield player Pablo Vergara to Chacarita Juniors, recently relegated to the Argentine second division.

References

External links
 Argentine Primera statistics
 Football-Lineups player profile

1985 births
Living people
People from General Rodríguez Partido
Argentine footballers
Association football midfielders
Club Atlético Banfield footballers
Chacarita Juniors footballers
Argentine Primera División players
Sportspeople from Buenos Aires Province